Kingston Law College is a Legal education institution situated at Berunanpukuria, North 24 Parganas in the indian state of West Bengal. It is affiliated to the West Bengal State University. It offers 3 years and 5-year Integrated Course in Law leading to L.L.B. and B.A. LL.B. degree which is approved by the Bar Council of India (BCI), New Delhi.

History
Kingston Educational Institute established various branches of study. In 2004 it set up Kingston Science College and Kingston Law college at Berunanpukuria. At present, it is the only law college under the West Bengal State University.

See also
Education in India
List of colleges in West Bengal
Education in West Bengal
Kingston College of Science

References

External links

Law schools in West Bengal
Educational institutions established in 2004
Colleges affiliated to West Bengal State University
Universities and colleges in North 24 Parganas district
2004 establishments in West Bengal